Barry J. Gordon (born 1951) is an American behavioral neurologist and cognitive neuroscientist. He is the inaugural holder of the therapeutic cognitive neuroscience endowed professorship and a professor of neurology with a joint appointment in cognitive science at the Johns Hopkins School of Medicine.

Life 
Gordon was born in 1951. He completed a B.S. from the Pennsylvania State University. He earned an M.D. from the Thomas Jefferson University in 1973. He conducted a medical internship at the New York Hospital-Cornell Medical Center. In 1977, Gordon completed a neurology residency at the Johns Hopkins Hospital. He completed a M.A. and Ph.D. in psychology from the Johns Hopkins University after joining the department of neurology faculty. His 1981 dissertation was titled, Lexical access and lexical decision: mechanisms of frequency sensitivity.

Gordon is the inaugural holder of the therapeutic cognitive neuroscience endowed professorship and a professor of neurology with a joint appointment in cognitive science at the Johns Hopkins School of Medicine. After his son was diagnosed with non-verbal autism, Gordon researched late speech development and designed an intensive therapy program to help him learn to speak.

Gordon is a former president of the Behavioral Neurology Society. He is an elected member of the American Neurological Association and a fellow of the American Academy of Neurology and the American Psychological Association. Gordon is the editor-in-chief of Cognitive and Behavioral Neurology.

Selected works

References 

Living people
1951 births
Place of birth missing (living people)
Pennsylvania State University alumni
Jefferson Medical College alumni
Johns Hopkins University alumni
Johns Hopkins School of Medicine faculty
Johns Hopkins Hospital physicians
American neurologists
American cognitive neuroscientists
20th-century American physicians
21st-century American physicians
Physician-scientists
American medical researchers
Autism researchers
20th-century American psychologists
21st-century American psychologists
Medical journal editors
Fellows of the American Academy of Neurology
Fellows of the American Psychological Association